Michael Alexander Leask (born 29 October 1990) is a Scottish cricketer. He played for Scotland in the 2014 Cricket World Cup Qualifier tournament. On 9 May 2014 at Aberdeen, he scored 42 off 16 balls in an ODI against England and was named as the man of the match, despite Scotland losing the game.

Ahead of the 2016 season, Leask signed for Somerset. In September 2017, after two seasons with Somerset, it was announced that Leask was to leave the county at the end of the season. He made his first-class debut for Scotland in the 2015–17 ICC Intercontinental Cup on 1 October 2017.

In June 2019, he was selected to represent Scotland A in their tour to Ireland to play the Ireland Wolves. In July 2019, he was selected to play for the Edinburgh Rocks in the inaugural edition of the Euro T20 Slam cricket tournament. However, the following month the tournament was cancelled.

In September 2019, he was named in Scotland's squad for the 2019 ICC T20 World Cup Qualifier tournament in the United Arab Emirates. In September 2021, Leask was named in Scotland's provisional squad for the 2021 ICC Men's T20 World Cup.

References

External links
 
 

1990 births
Living people
Cricketers at the 2015 Cricket World Cup
Cricketers from Aberdeen
Marylebone Cricket Club cricketers
Northamptonshire cricketers
Scotland One Day International cricketers
Scotland Twenty20 International cricketers
Scottish cricketers
Somerset cricketers